Golubkovia is a single-species genus in the family Teloschistaceae. It contains the species Golubkovia trachyphylla, a crustose lichen. The genus was circumscribed in 2014 by Sergey Kondratyuk, Ingvar Kärnefelt, John Elix, Arne Thell, and Jae-Seoun Hur. The generic name honours Russian lichenologist Nina Golubkova (1932–2009), who, according to the authors, "made important contributions to lichenology in northern Eurasia".

Golubkovia belongs to a clade contains the genus Xanthomendoza, with which it shares the characteristic of having a well-developed, thick layer of plectenchyma in the medulla. Unlike Xanthomendoza, Golubkovia does not have a lower cortical layer, it has an upper cortical layer that is scleroplectenchymatous, and it has a prosoplectenchymatous true exciple (the ring-shaped layer surrounding the hymenium). Additionally, the lichen is attached differently to its substrate. Golubkovia trachyphylla is a widely distributed lichen found in Asia and North America, where it grows on rocks in arid habitat. It has a yellow-orange, crustose thallus that is placodioid in form (i.e., comprising lobes that radiate out from a centre).

References

Teloschistales
Lichen genera
Taxa described in 2014
Teloschistales genera
Taxa named by Sergey Kondratyuk
Taxa named by Ingvar Kärnefelt
Taxa named by John Alan Elix